Fadum House is a historic home which was designed by architect James W. Fitzgibbon and is located at Raleigh, Wake County, North Carolina.  It was built in 1949, and is a two-story, Modern Movement-style dwelling.  It is constructed of glass, brick and wood and features a double cantilevered roof on built-up wood columns.

It was listed on the National Register of Historic Places in 1993.

References

Houses on the National Register of Historic Places in North Carolina
Modernist architecture in North Carolina
Houses completed in 1949
Houses in Raleigh, North Carolina
National Register of Historic Places in Raleigh, North Carolina